TD Place is a sports facility in Ottawa, Ontario, Canada which includes:

 TD Place Arena, an indoor arena
 TD Place Stadium, an outdoor stadium

See also
TD Arena in Charleston, South Carolina
TD Ballpark in Dunedin, Florida
TD Garden in Boston, Massachusetts
TD Stadium in London, Ontario